(Lissi and the Wild Emperor) is a 2007 German animated film comedy parody of the Sissi films.

Plot
A yeti makes a pact with the devil to kidnap the most beautiful girl in the world. This turns out to be the Princess Lissi, who is clearly the Austrian Princess and later Empress Elisabeth of Austria, and much of the film is taken up with subplots related to the court and to the romantic relationship between Elisabeth and her husband. The "wild" emperor of the title is thus Franz Joseph I of Austria, though it is also a play on the "Wilder Kaiser", a ridge in the Austrian Kaiser Mountains.

The film had more than 2 million viewers at cinemas in Germany alone, and more than 3 million in Europe overall.

References

External links 
 

2007 films
2007 computer-animated films
German animated films
German comedy films
Bigfoot films
2000s parody films
Films set in Austria
Films set in Bavaria
Films set in the 19th century
Films about royalty
Films directed by Michael Herbig
Cultural depictions of Empress Elisabeth of Austria
Cultural depictions of Franz Joseph I of Austria
Deal with the Devil
Films about Yeti
2007 comedy films
2000s German films
Films à clef